An evaluability assessment  (EA) is a qualitative investigation employed before a programme is evaluated.

Description
Evaluability assessments (EAs) provide information of whether a programme can be evaluated or not. They are also used to describe the objectives, logic and activities of the programme with an aim to investigate its credibility, feasibility, sustainability and acceptability. EAs address the likelihood of the programme achieving its anticipated outcomes, the required changes needed for optimum management, whether an evaluation can improve the programme's performance and to identify stakeholder interests in the evaluation and how the findings will be used. According to Jung and Schubert (1983) these specific aspects of a programme need to be address by an EA:
Obtaining perspectives of all involved in the programme e.g. programme staff and stakeholders
Investigating the programmes objectives the methods to measure whether they were achieved
Providing information of the how the programme is actually functioning
Identifying ways to improve the programme
Relaying important information about the programme

Procedure
Evaluability assessors form a workgroup which comprises an evaluation representative and a managerial member of the programme. The workgroup investigates official programme records and documentation. In addition, interviews and observations are conducted to understand and describe how the programme is perceived by the programme staff and relevant stakeholders. The workgroup is supervised by a policy group who oversees managerial decisions concerning the impending evaluation of the programme. Jung and Schubert (1983) provide six areas  which ought to be addressed in an EA. These include:
Identifying the programme's objectives
Identifying the intended activities to achieve the programme objectives
Identifying incongruities between the programme's objectives and its intended activities
Investigating field operations
Comparing actual field operations to the programme's intended activities
Providing management and evaluation options

Potential limitations
An effective EA requires that workgroups and policy groups collaboratively engage with programme staff and stakeholders. This could be problematic when there are differences or tensions that arise between programme staff and stakeholders, posing a challenge to the EA. 
Thurston, Graham, and Hatfield (2003) state that EAs are beneficial since they facilitate programme revisions. It is often found that after an EA, programmes require some modifications as there could be inconsistencies with the logic model or issues concerning implementation.

A tension may arise when there are positive unintended outcomes that occur when a programme is poorly designed. How do the evaluability assessors, programme staff and stakeholders manage this difficulty? Is it permissible to allow the problematic programme to operate because of the benefits derived from it, or should the programme be put on hold and reformulated resulting in the end of the positive unintended outcomes?.

Conclusion
EAs are complex and require cooperation from relevant individuals involved in a programme. They are subjective assessments of how credible a programme is. Despite their limitations, EAs are valuable tools to promptly address issues that arise in a programme. If an EA is efficiently conducted on a poorly designed programme, it has the potential to save programme staff and stakeholders time and funding resources that would be otherwise wasted if the programme were to continue operating unaltered.

References

Evaluation
Evaluation methods